This is a list of electoral division results for the 2022 Australian federal election in the state of New South Wales.

This election was held using Instant-runoff voting (often referred to locally as preferential voting), a form of ranked voting where voters order candidates in order of preference. The number of first preferences for each candidate is first counted, and then the candidate with the lowest number of votes is eliminated and their votes are each transferred to the remaining candidate which they gave the highest preference to. This process of eliminating and transferring the votes of the last-placed remaining candidates is repeated until there are only two candidates left, at which point the candidate with more votes (including those transferred) wins. This can mean that a candidate who does not have the most first preferences can be elected if no candidate takes majority of votes in the first count and that candidate accumulates enough transferred votes to overtake the original leader.

In this election there were seven such reversals in New South Wales—Labor won three seats where the Labor candidate did not have the most first preferences (Bennelong, Gilmore and Robertson), and independent candidates won four seats where they did not have the most first preferences (Fowler, Mackellar, North Sydney and Wentworth).

Overall results

Results by division

Banks

Barton

Bennelong

Berowra

Blaxland

Bradfield

Calare

Chifley

Cook

Cowper

Cunningham

Dobell

Eden-Monaro

Farrer

Fowler

Gilmore

Grayndler

Greenway

Hughes

Hume

Hunter

Kingsford Smith

Lindsay

Lyne

Macarthur

Mackellar

Macquarie

McMahon

Mitchell

New England

Newcastle

North Sydney

Page

Parkes

Parramatta

Paterson

Reid

Richmond

Riverina

Robertson

Shortland

Sydney

Warringah

Watson

Wentworth

Werriwa

Whitlam

Results by region

Sydney

Sydney surrounds

Regional

References

New South Wales 2022
2022 Australian federal election